Thomas Morris (February 26, 1771 – March 12, 1849) was a United States representative from New York and was the son of Founding Father Robert Morris.

Early life
Morris was born on February 26, 1771, in Philadelphia in the Province of Pennsylvania to Robert Morris and Mary (née White) Morris.  His father was a slave-trader, merchant, signer of the Declaration of Independence and the Constitution, and later a U.S. Senator.  His mother's brother was William White, the Anglican Bishop of Pennsylvania.

From 1781 to 1786, he attended school in Geneva, Switzerland and the University of Leipzig, in Germany, from 1786 to 1788.

Career
After studying abroad, Morris returned to Philadelphia and studied law; he was admitted to the bar and commenced practice in Canandaigua, New York. He was a member of the New York State Assembly from 1794 to 1796.

Morris was elected as a Federalist to the Seventh Congress, holding office from March 4, 1801, to March 3, 1803.  He was not a candidate for renomination, and resumed the practice of law in New York City in 1803. He was appointed United States Marshal for the Southern District of New York in 1816, 1820, 1825, and 1829.

Morris was said to have settled the peace with the Six Nations of the Iroquois Confederacy, four of whom had sided with the British during the Revolution.  His father then sold his substantial property in Western New York, which the younger Morris oversaw, to the Holland Land Company in 1792–1793 for redevelopment in parcels, although some sources identify the sale at five years later, in 1797–1798.

Personal life
Morris was married to Elizabeth Sarah Kane (1771–1853), the daughter of Col. John Kane (1734–1808) and Sybil Kent Kane. Elizabeth's brother, Elisha Kane, and sister-in-law, 
Alida Van Rensselaer, were the parents of John K. Kane (1795–1858), the Attorney General of Pennsylvania.  Her sister, Sybil Adeline Kane, married Alida's brother, Jeremias Van Rensselaer (1769–1827), both children of Robert Van Rensselaer.  Together, they were the parents of:

 Mary Morris (1800–1885), who married Charles Apthorp Van den Heuvel (d. 1879), son of Jan Cornelis Van den Heuvel.
 Sally Morris (1801–1848), who died unmarried.
 John Morris (1802–1879)
 Robert Kane Morris (1808–1833), who died unmarried.
 Henry White Morris (1805–1863), who died unmarried.
 Harriet Morris (1807–1882), who died unmarried.
 Emily Morris (1809–1884), who died unmarried.
 Archibald Morris (b. 1811), who died young. Died 30 Sep 1822.
 William Morris (1813–1817), who died young.
 Caroline Julia Morris (1814–1888), who married John Stark.
 William White Morris (1817–1866), who died unmarried.
 Charles Frederick Morris (1819–1874)

Morris died in 1849 in New York City.

References

External links

1771 births
1849 deaths
Politicians from Philadelphia
New York (state) lawyers
United States Marshals
Members of the New York State Assembly
Politicians from Canandaigua, New York
Federalist Party members of the United States House of Representatives from New York (state)
19th-century American lawyers